The 2006 Superbike World Championship was the nineteenth FIM Superbike World Championship season. The season started on 25 February at Losail, and finished on 8 October at Magny-Cours after 12 rounds and 24 races. The original season calendar issued by the FIM included a 13th round scheduled in South Africa on 22 October but the round was cancelled at the request of the series' promoter FGSport.

2006 saw the return of Australian Troy Bayliss in Superbike World Championship after 3 years in MotoGP. The combination of Bayliss and Ducati proved unstoppable and they dominated the season winning 12 races, 8 of them consecutive. Honda's James Toseland and Yamaha's Noriyuki Haga battled for second with the British rider coming on top. Defending champion Troy Corser on a Suzuki was fourth. The manufacturers' championship was won by Ducati.

Race calendar and results

Championship standings

Riders' standings

Manufacturers' standings

Entry list

References

 
Superbike World Championship seasons
World